Saint-Joachim is a parish municipality in Quebec, Canada. It is part of the La Côte-de-Beaupré Regional County Municipality in the Capitale-Nationale region. Located at the foot of Cape Tourmente, it is home to the Cap Tourmente National Wildlife Area and Canyon Sainte-Anne.

History
The area, first called after Cape Tourmente, is one of the first places of New France to be colonized. In 1628, it was destroyed by the Kirke Brothers but it became an agricultural centre again after 1668 when François de Laval bought land around the cape to establish farms to feed his Seminary of Quebec. A few years later, the Saint-Joachim Parish was founded, and the place became known by the parish name.

In 1845, the parish municipality was formed, but abolished in 1847, and reestablished in 1855.

In 1916, Saint-Joachim lost large portions of its territory when the Parish Municipality of Saint-Louis-de-Gonzague-du-Cap-Tourmente was created to separate the lands and buildings belonging to the seminary from Saint-Joachim. However, except for a small enclave, these lands have returned to Saint-Joachim over time.

Demographics 

Population trend:
 Population in 2011: 1,471 (revised from 1,458 by Statistics Canada)
 Population in 2006: 1,362
 Population in 2001: 1,471
 Population in 1996: 1,493
 Population in 1991: 1,478

Mother tongue:
 English as first language: 0%
 French as first language: 100%
 English and French as first language: 0%
 Other as first language: 0%

Image gallery

See also
 List of parish municipalities in Quebec

References

External links

Parish municipalities in Quebec
Incorporated places in Capitale-Nationale